The 1974 Amstel Gold Race was the ninth edition of the annual road bicycle race "Amstel Gold Race", held on Sunday April 13, 1974, in the Dutch provinces of Limburg. The race stretched 238 kilometres, with the start in Heerlen and the finish in Meerssen. There were a total of 137 competitors, and 31 cyclists finished the race.

Result

External links
 Results
 

Amstel Gold Race
1974 in road cycling
1974 in Dutch sport